Mairo Jinadu (born 28 December 1948) is a Nigerian sprinter. She competed in the women's 4 × 100 metres relay at the 1968 Summer Olympics.

References

External links
 

1948 births
Living people
Athletes (track and field) at the 1968 Summer Olympics
Nigerian female sprinters
Olympic athletes of Nigeria
Place of birth missing (living people)
Olympic female sprinters
20th-century Nigerian women